Azim Khanlu (also Romanized as ‘Az̧īm Khānlū and ‘Az̧īmkhānlū) is a village in Hasanlu Rural District, Mohammadyar District, Naqadeh County, West Azerbaijan Province, Iran. At the 2006 census, its population was 163, in 34 families.

References 

Populated places in Naqadeh County